St. George's College may refer to:

Educational institutions
 St. George's College, Quilmes, Argentina
 St George College, South Australia, in Adelaide, Australia
 Royal St. George's College, Toronto, Canada
 University of Toronto St. George, Toronto, Canada
 Saint George's College, Santiago, Chile
 St. George's College, Cairo, Egypt
 St. George's College, Agra, India
 St. George's College Aruvithura, Kerala, India
 St George's College, Mussoorie, India
 St. George's College, Jamaica, in Kingston
 St George's College, Weybridge, Elmbridge, Surrey, UK
 St. George's College, Harare, Zimbabwe
 St. George's College, Jerusalem

Other
 College of Saint George, a chantry, Windsor

See also
 St. George's School (disambiguation)
 St. George's University, Grenada